Alfred Gwynne Vanderbilt Sr. (October 20, 1877 – May 7, 1915) was a wealthy American businessman, and a member of the Vanderbilt family.  A sportsman, he participated in and pioneered a number of related endeavors.  He died in the sinking of the RMS Lusitania.

Early life 
Vanderbilt was born in New York City, the third son of Cornelius Vanderbilt II (1843–1899) and Alice Claypoole Gwynne (1845–1934). His siblings were Alice Gwynne Vanderbilt (1869-1874), William Henry Vanderbilt II (1870–1892), Cornelius "Neily" Vanderbilt III (1873–1942), Gertrude Vanderbilt (1875–1942), Reginald Claypoole Vanderbilt (1880–1925) and Gladys Moore Vanderbilt (1886–1965).

Alfred Vanderbilt attended the St. Paul's School in Concord, New Hampshire, and Yale University (Class of 1899), where he was a member of Skull and Bones.  Soon after graduation, Vanderbilt, with a party of friends, started on a tour of the world which was to have lasted two years. When the group reached Japan on September 12, 1899, he received news of his father's sudden death and hastened home as speedily as possible to find himself, by his father's will, the head of his branch of the family.

His eldest brother, William, had died in 1892 at age 22, and their father had disinherited Alfred's second oldest brother Neily due to his marriage to Grace Wilson, a young debutante of whom the elder Vanderbilts strongly disapproved for a variety of reasons. Alfred received the largest share of his father's estate, though it was also divided among his sisters and his younger brother, Reginald.

Career 

Soon after his return to New York, Vanderbilt began working as a clerk in the offices of the New York Central Railroad, as preparation for entering into the councils of the company as one of its principal owners. Subsequently, he was chosen a director in other companies as well, among them the Fulton Chain Railway Company, Fulton Navigation Company, Raquette Lake Railway Company, Raquette Lake Transportation Company, and the Plaza Bank of New York.

Vanderbilt was a good judge of real estate values and projected several important enterprises. On the site of the former residence of the Vanderbilt family and on several adjacent plots, he built the Vanderbilt Hotel at Park Avenue and 34th Street, New York, which he made his city home.

Among Vanderbilt's many holdings were positions in the New York Central Railroad, Beech Creek Railroad, Lake Shore and Michigan Southern Railway, Michigan Central Railroad and Pittsburgh and Lake Erie Railroad as well as the Pullman Company.

Personal life 
On January 11, 1901, Vanderbilt married Ellen ("Elsie") Tuck French, in Newport, Rhode Island. She was the daughter of Francis Ormond French (1837–1893) and his wife Ellen Tuck (1838–1915), and was close friends with Vanderbilt's sister, Gertrude Vanderbilt Whitney, who was married to Harry Payne Whitney. Later that same year, on November 24, 1901, Elsie gave birth to their only child: William Henry Vanderbilt III (1901–1981), later governor of Rhode Island.

In March 1908, Elsie moved to the home of her brother, Amos Tuck French, in Tuxedo Park, New York. Shortly thereafter, a scandal erupted in April 1908 after Elsie filed for divorce, alleging adultery with Agnes O'Brien Ruíz, the wife of the Cuban attaché in Washington, D. C. The publicity, which caused splits over whom to support, ultimately led Agnes Ruíz to commit suicide in 1909. Elsie, who remarried, died in Newport on February 27, 1948.

Vanderbilt spent considerable time in London after the divorce, and remarried there, on December 17, 1911, to the wealthy American divorcée Margaret Mary Emerson (1886–1960). She was the daughter of Captain Isaac Edward Emerson (1859–1931) and Emily Askew Dunn (1854–1921), and was heiress to the Bromo-Seltzer fortune. Margaret had been married from 1902-1910 to Dr. Smith Hollins McKim (d. 1932), a wealthy physician of Baltimore. Together, Alfred and Margaret had two children: Alfred Gwynne Vanderbilt Jr. (1912–1999), a businessman and racehorse breeder, and George Washington Vanderbilt III (1914–1961), a yachtsman and scientific explorer.

After Alfred's death aboard the Lusitania in 1915, Margaret bought a 316-acre estate in Lenox, Massachusetts, with a 47-room mansion. She remarried twice, first on June 12, 1918, in Lenox to Raymond T. Baker (1875–1935), a politician with whom she had a daughter, Gloria Baker (1920–1975). The claim for Alfred's estate was put forward by Margaret, who by that point was already remarried. The net value of the estate, after the payment of all debts and funeral and administration expenses, was $15,594,836.32.

By the terms of Alfred's will, Margaret and his three sons would inherit $1,180,098.18. In addition, for their maintenance and for the support and comfort of his widow and children, he expended and contributed approximately $300,000 annually.

Interests 
Vanderbilt was a sportsman, and he particularly enjoyed fox hunting and coaching. In the late 19th century, he and a number of other millionaires, such as James Hazen Hyde practiced the old English coaching techniques of the early 19th century. Meeting near Holland House in London, the coaching group would take their vehicle for a one-day, two-day, or longer trip along chosen routes through several counties, going to prearranged inns and hotels along the routes. Vanderbilt would frequently drive the coach, in perfectly appareled suit, a coachman or groom. He is recorded as a regular guest at the Burford Bridge Hotel near Box Hill in Surrey where, when driving from London to Brighton, he would stop to take lunch and to collect telegrams. He loved the outdoor experience.

In 1902, he bought Great Camp Sagamore, on Sagamore Lake in the Adirondacks, from William West Durant. He expanded and improved the property to include flush toilets, a sewer system, and hot and cold running water. He later added a hydroelectric plant and an outdoor bowling alley with an ingenious system for retrieving the balls. Other amenities included a tennis court, a croquet lawn, a 100,000 gallon reservoir, and a working farm.

In 1908, he donated $100,000 to build the Mary Street YMCA (today the Vanderbilt Hotel)  in Newport, Rhode Island, in memory of his father Cornelius Vanderbilt II (1843 – 1899). Ground breaking was on August 31, 1908, with the cornerstone laid on November 19, 1908 by Vanderbilt. The dedication was on January 1, 1910.

RMS Lusitania 
On May 1, 1915, Vanderbilt boarded the  bound for Liverpool as a first class passenger. It was a business trip, and he traveled with only his valet, Ronald Denyer, leaving his family at home in New York.

On May 7, off the coast of County Cork, Ireland, German U-boat,  torpedoed the ship, triggering a secondary explosion that sank the giant ocean liner within 18 minutes. Vanderbilt and Denyer helped others into lifeboats, and then Vanderbilt gave his lifejacket to save a female passenger. Vanderbilt had promised the young mother of a small baby that he would locate an extra lifevest for her. Failing to do so, he offered her his own life vest, which he proceeded to tie on to her himself, since she was holding her infant child in her arms at the time. Many considered his actions especially noble since he could not swim and he knew there were no other lifevests or lifeboats available. Because of his fame, several people on the Lusitania who survived the tragedy were observing him while events unfolded at the time, and so they took note of his actions. He and Denyer were among the 1,198 passengers who did not survive the incident. His body was never recovered.

There has been some historical confusion as to which member of the Vanderbilt family was booked on the Titanic in 1912 and recent studies have determined that his uncle George Washington Vanderbilt II was actually booked to travel on the Titanic along with his wife Edith and daughter Cornelia, not Alfred Vanderbilt.

Legacy

A memorial was erected on the A24 London to Worthing Road in Holmwood, just south of Dorking. The inscription reads, "In Memory of Alfred Gwynne Vanderbilt, a gallant gentleman and a fine sportsman who perished in the Lusitania May 7th 1915. This stone is erected on his favorite road by a few of his British coaching friends and admirers".

A memorial fountain to Vanderbilt is in Vanderbilt Park on Broadway in Newport, Rhode Island, where many members of the Vanderbilt family spent their summers. The memorial reads: "To the Memory of Alfred Gwynne Vanderbilt, who perished on the S.S. Lusitania in the Thirty-eighth year of his age May 7, 1915. Erected by fifty of his friends."

Children
By Elsie French Vanderbilt:
William Henry Vanderbilt III, Governor of Rhode Island and business executive.

By Margaret E. McKim Vanderbilt
Alfred Gwynne Vanderbilt Jr., naval officer, Silver Star recipient, horse breeder and President of Belmont Park.
George Washington Vanderbilt III, naval officer, explorer and scientist.

Bibliography

External links 

 
 Biography at The Lusitania Resource

1877 births
1915 deaths
American people of Dutch descent
American people of English descent
American people of Welsh descent
American socialites
Businesspeople from New York City
Deaths on the RMS Lusitania
New York (state) Republicans
Alfred Gwynne
19th-century American businesspeople
19th-century American Episcopalians